František Čermák and Julian Knowle were the defending champions but decided not to participate together. Knowle teamed up with Leonardo Mayer, but lost in the first round to Daniel Brands and Michal Mertiňák.  Čermák played alongside Lukáš Dlouhý, but lost in the final to Martin Emmrich and Christopher Kas, 4–6, 3–6.

Seeds

Draw

Draw

References
 Main Draw

Bet-at-home Cup Kitzbuhel - Doubles
2013 Doubles